The long-tailed fantail (Rhipidura opistherythra) is a species of bird in the family Rhipiduridae. It is endemic to the Tanimbar Islands, where its natural habitat is subtropical or tropical moist lowland forests. It is threatened by habitat loss.

References

long-tailed fantail
Birds of the Tanimbar Islands
long-tailed fantail
long-tailed fantail
Taxonomy articles created by Polbot